In probability theory, a distribution is said to be stable if a linear combination of two independent random variables with this distribution has the same distribution, up to location and scale parameters. A random variable is said to be stable if its distribution is stable. The stable distribution family is also sometimes referred to as the Lévy alpha-stable distribution, after Paul Lévy, the first mathematician to have studied it.

Of the four parameters defining the family, most attention has been focused on the stability parameter,  (see panel). The importance of stable probability distributions is that they are "attractors" for properly normed sums of independent and identically distributed (iid) random variables. The normal distribution defines a family of stable distributions. By the classical central limit theorem the properly normed sum of a set of random variables, each with finite variance, will tend toward a normal distribution as the number of variables increases. Without the finite variance assumption, the limit may be a stable distribution that is not normal. Mandelbrot referred to such distributions as "stable Paretian distributions", after Vilfredo Pareto.

Definition
A non-degenerate distribution is a stable distribution if it satisfies the following property:

Since the normal distribution, the Cauchy distribution, and the Lévy distribution all have the above property, it follows that they are special cases of stable distributions.

The characteristic function  of any probability distribution is just the Fourier transform of its probability density function . The density function is therefore the inverse Fourier transform of the characteristic function:

Although the probability density function for a general stable distribution cannot be written analytically, the general characteristic function can be expressed analytically. A random variable X is called stable if its characteristic function can be written as

μ ∈ R  is a shift parameter, called the skewness parameter, is a measure of asymmetry. Notice that in this context the usual skewness is not well defined, as for  the distribution does not admit 2nd or higher moments, and the usual skewness definition is the 3rd central moment.

The reason this gives a stable distribution is that the characteristic function for the sum of two independent random variables equals the product of the two corresponding characteristic functions.

Not every function is the characteristic function of a legitimate probability distribution (that is, one whose cumulative distribution function is real and goes from 0 to 1 without decreasing), but the characteristic functions given above will be legitimate so long as the parameters are in their ranges. The value of the characteristic function at some value t is the complex conjugate of its value at −t as it should be so that the probability distribution function will be real.

In the simplest case , the characteristic function is just a stretched exponential function; the  distribution is symmetric about μ and is referred to as a (Lévy) symmetric alpha-stable distribution, often abbreviated SαS.

The parameter c > 0 is a scale factor which is a measure of the width of the distribution while  is the exponent or index of the distribution and specifies the asymptotic behavior of the distribution.

Parametrizations 

A continuous parametrization  is

where:

In the first parametrization, this is done by defining the new variable:

For the second parametrization, we simply use

no matter what  is. In the first parametrization, if the mean exists (that is) then it is equal to μ, whereas in the second parametrization when the mean exists it is equal to

The distribution
A stable distribution is therefore specified by the above four parameters. It can be shown that any non-degenerate stable distribution has a smooth (infinitely differentiable) density function. If  denotes the density of X and Y is the sum of independent copies of X:

then Y has the density  with

This "heavy tail" behavior causes the variance of stable distributions to be infinite for all . This property is illustrated in the log–log plots below.

When , the distribution is Gaussian (see below), with tails asymptotic to exp(−x2/4c2)/(2c√π).

One-sided stable distribution and stable count distribution 
This family is called one-sided stable distribution. Its standard distribution (μ=0) is defined as

, where .

Thus the integral form of its PDF is 

The double-sine integral is more effective for very small .

Consider the Lévy sum  where , then Y has the density   where . Set , we arrive at the stable count distribution. Its standard distribution is defined as

The stable count distribution is the conjugate prior of the one-sided stable distribution. Its location-scale family is defined as

The location parameter  is the cut-off location, while  defines its scale.

When ,  is the Lévy distribution which is an inverse gamma distribution. Thus  is a shifted gamma distribution of shape 3/2 and scale ,

, where , .

Thus the stable count distribution is the first-order marginal distribution of a volatility process. In this context,  is called the "floor volatility".

Another approach to derive the stable count distribution is to use the Laplace transform of the one-sided stable distribution, (Section 2.4 of )

, where .

Let , and one can decompose the integral on the left hand side as a product distribution of a standard Laplace distribution and a standard stable count distribution,f

, where .

This is called the "lambda decomposition" (See Section 4 of ) since the right hand side was named as "symmetric lambda distribution" in Lihn's former works. However, it has several more popular names such as "exponential power distribution", or the "generalized error/normal distribution", often referred to when .

This in a way solves the thorny issue of diverging moments in the stable distribution.

Properties 
 All stable distributions are infinitely divisible.
 With the exception of the normal distribution, stable distributions are leptokurtotic and heavy-tailed distributions.
 Closure under convolution

Since convolution is equivalent to multiplication of the Fourier-transformed function, it follows that the product of two stable characteristic functions with the same  will yield another such characteristic function. The product of two stable characteristic functions is given by:

Since  is not a function of the μ, c or  variables it follows that these parameters for the convolved function are given by:

In each case, it can be shown that the resulting parameters lie within the required intervals for a stable distribution.

A generalized central limit theorem 

Another important property of stable distributions is the role that they play in a generalized central limit theorem. The central limit theorem states that the sum of a number of independent and identically distributed (i.i.d.) random variables with finite non-zero variances will tend to a normal distribution as the number of variables grows.

A generalization due to Gnedenko and Kolmogorov states that the sum of a number of random variables with symmetric distributions having power-law tails (Paretian tails), decreasing as  where  (and therefore having infinite variance), will tend to a stable distribution  as the number of summands grows. If  then the sum converges to a stable distribution with stability parameter equal to 2, i.e. a Gaussian distribution.

There are other possibilities as well.

Assuming for the moment that t → 0, we take the limit of the above as :

Therefore:

This shows that  is asymptotic to  so using the previous equation we have

This implies that the sum divided by

converges in distribution to the symmetric alpha-stable distribution with stability parameter  and scale parameter 1.

This random variable has a mean but the variance is infinite. Let us take the following distribution:

We can write this as

where

We want to find the leading terms of the asymptotic expansion of the characteristic function. The characteristic function of the probability distribution  is  so the characteristic function for f(x) is

and we can calculate:

Therefore,

and according to what was said above (and the fact that the variance of f(x;2,0,1,0) is 2), the sum of n instances of this random variable, divided by  will converge in distribution to a Gaussian distribution with variance 1. But the variance at any particular n will still be infinite. Note that the width of the limiting distribution grows faster than in the case where the random variable has a finite variance (in which case the width grows as the square root of n). The average, obtained by dividing the sum by n, tends toward a Gaussian whose width approaches zero as n increases, in accordance with the Law of large numbers.

Special cases

There is no general analytic solution for the form of f(x). There are, however three special cases which can be expressed in terms of elementary functions as can be seen by inspection of the characteristic function:

 For  the distribution reduces to a Gaussian distribution with variance σ2 = 2c2 and mean μ; the skewness parameter  has no effect.
 For  and  the distribution reduces to a Cauchy distribution with scale parameter c and shift parameter μ.
 For  and  the distribution reduces to a Lévy distribution with scale parameter c and shift parameter μ.

Note that the above three distributions are also connected, in the following way: A standard Cauchy random variable can be viewed as a mixture of Gaussian random variables (all with mean zero), with the variance being drawn from a standard Lévy distribution. And in fact this is a special case of a more general theorem (See p. 59 of ) which allows any symmetric alpha-stable distribution to be viewed in this way (with the alpha parameter of the mixture distribution equal to twice the alpha parameter of the mixing distribution—and the beta parameter of the mixing distribution always equal to one).

Fox H-Functions can also be used to express the stable probability density functions. For simple rational numbers, the closed form expression is often in terms of less complicated special functions. Several closed form expressions having rather simple expressions in terms of special functions are available. In the table below, PDFs expressible by elementary functions are indicated by an E and those that are expressible by special functions are indicated by an s.

Some of the special cases are known by particular names:

 For  and  the distribution reduces to a Holtsmark distribution with scale parameter c and shift parameter μ.

Also, in the limit as c approaches zero or as α approaches zero the distribution will approach a Dirac delta function .

Series representation
The stable distribution can be restated as the real part of a simpler integral:

Expressing the second exponential as a Taylor series, we have:

where . Reversing the order of integration and summation, and carrying out the integration yields:

which will be valid for x ≠ μ and will converge for appropriate values of the parameters. (Note that the n = 0 term which yields a delta function in x − μ has therefore been dropped.) Expressing the first exponential as a series will yield another series in positive powers of x − μ which is generally less useful.

There is no real part to sum. Instead, the integral of the characteristic function should be carried out on the negative axis, which yields:

Simulation of stable variables 
Simulating sequences of stable random variables is not straightforward, since there are no analytic expressions for the inverse  nor the CDF  itself. All standard approaches like the rejection or the inversion methods would require tedious computations. A much more elegant and efficient solution was proposed by Chambers, Mallows and Stuck (CMS), who noticed that a certain integral formula yielded the following algorithm:
 for  compute: 
 for  compute:  where 

This algorithm yields a random variable . For a detailed proof see.

If  then

For  (and ) the CMS method reduces to the well known Box-Muller transform for generating Gaussian random variables. Many other approaches have been proposed in the literature, including application of Bergström and LePage series expansions, see  and, respectively. However, the CMS method is regarded as the fastest and the most accurate.

Applications 
Stable distributions owe their importance in both theory and practice to the generalization of the central limit theorem to random variables without second (and possibly first) order moments and the accompanying self-similarity of the stable family. It was the seeming departure from normality along with the demand for a self-similar model for financial data (i.e. the shape of the distribution for yearly asset price changes should resemble that of the constituent daily or monthly price changes) that led Benoît Mandelbrot to propose that cotton prices follow an alpha-stable distribution with  equal to 1.7. Lévy distributions are frequently found in analysis of critical behavior and financial data.

They are also found in spectroscopy as a general expression for a quasistatically pressure broadened spectral line.

The Lévy distribution of solar flare waiting time events (time between flare events) was demonstrated for CGRO BATSE hard x-ray solar flares in December 2001. Analysis of the Lévy statistical signature revealed that two different memory signatures were evident; one related to the solar cycle and the second whose origin appears to be associated with a localized or combination of localized solar active region effects.

Other analytic cases 

A number of cases of analytically expressible stable distributions are known. Let the stable distribution be expressed by  then we know:

 The Cauchy Distribution is given by 
 The Lévy distribution is given by 
 The Normal distribution is given by 
 Let  be a Lommel function, then: 
 Let  and  denote the Fresnel Integrals then: 
 Let  be the modified Bessel function of the second kind then: 
 If the  denote the hypergeometric functions then:   with the latter being the Holtsmark distribution.
 Let  be a Whittaker function, then:

See also
Lévy flight
Lévy process
 Other "power law" distributions
 Pareto distribution
 Zeta distribution
 Zipf distribution
 Zipf–Mandelbrot distribution
Financial models with long-tailed distributions and volatility clustering
Multivariate stable distribution
Discrete-stable distribution

Notes
 The STABLE program for Windows is available from John Nolan's stable webpage: http://www.robustanalysis.com/public/stable.html. It calculates the density (pdf), cumulative distribution function (cdf) and quantiles for a general stable distribution, and performs maximum likelihood estimation of stable parameters and some exploratory data analysis techniques for assessing the fit of a data set.
 libstable is a C implementation for the Stable distribution pdf, cdf, random number, quantile and fitting functions (along with a benchmark replication package and an R package).
 R Package 'stabledist'  by Diethelm Wuertz, Martin Maechler and Rmetrics core team members.  Computes stable density, probability, quantiles, and random numbers.  Updated Sept. 12, 2016.
 Python implementation is located in scipy.stats.levy_stable in the SciPy package.

References

Continuous distributions
Probability distributions with non-finite variance
Power laws
 
Stability (probability)